Neuville-lès-Lœuilly (literally Neuville near Lœuilly) is a former commune in the Somme department in Hauts-de-France in northern France. On 1 January 2019, it was merged into the new commune Ô-de-Selle.

Geography

Population

See also
Communes of the Somme department

References

Former communes of Somme (department)
Populated places disestablished in 2019